"Santa Tell Me" is a Christmas song recorded by American singer Ariana Grande. It was written by Grande, Ilya Salmanzadeh and Savan Kotecha. The song was released worldwide on November 24, 2014, via iTunes Store, and was included on the Japanese exclusive reissue of Grande's EP Christmas Kisses.

Commercially, "Santa Tell Me" reached the top 10 in Australia, Austria, Canada, Czech Republic, Denmark, Finland, Germany, Greece, Hungary, Latvia, Lithuania, Netherlands, New Zealand, Norway, Portugal, Singapore, Slovakia, South Korea, Sweden and Switzerland, as well as the top 20 in Belgium, Croatia, Ireland, Italy, Malaysia, the Philippines and the United Kingdom. The song entered the US Billboard Hot 100 at number 65 and later peaked at number 12, as the song continues to become a modern-day classic. Additionally on Billboard Global 200 chart, "Santa Tell Me" peaked at number 5. The music video was directed by Chris Marrs Piliero and was released on Grande's official Vevo on December 12, 2014. The song received its first performance at the 2014 A Very Grammy Christmas concert in the Shrine Auditorium in Los Angeles on November 18, 2014.

Background
Grande released her first Christmas EP titled Christmas Kisses on December 17, 2013. The extended play had a total of 4 songs, and included covers of classics, such as "Santa Baby" and Wham!'s "Last Christmas". It also contained two original songs: "Love Is Everything" and "Snow in California".

"Santa Tell Me" was first mentioned by Grande on Tuesday, October 28 in a livestream through Twitcam. In the livestream, she said that she didn't want to do a Christmas song at first, but she changed her mind. Grande also announced that a music video would accompany "Santa Tell Me", and that this song was her favorite Christmas song out of all of the ones she had recorded so far.

She officially announced the song and its title on her Twitter page on November 13, 2014, saying, "putting out a kewt Christmas song for u on nov 24th called Santa Tell Me! lil something for the holidays :) so excited #10DaysTilSantaTellMe." It was also released to US mainstream radio.

Promotion and release
Grande used the hashtag #10DaysTilSantaTellMe on Twitter to initiate the 10-day countdown of the song's release. She also performed the song for the first time on November 18, 2014, at the 2014 A Very Grammy Christmas concert in the Shrine Auditorium in Los Angeles, CA. On November 18, Republic Records released the cover art of the song, which depicts a simple light pink background with "Santa Tell Me" written in the middle in golden script. On November 21, Republic Records also released a 15-second snippet of "Santa Tell Me" through their Instagram page; the preview contained part of the chorus. Grande tweeted the last hashtag on November 23, #SantaTellMeTonight. She also posted the iTunes link of the song, which was then available for pre-order.

"Santa Tell Me" was released at midnight on November 24 on iTunes. The audio was also uploaded to Grande's official YouTube channel, ArianaGrandeVevo on November 24. Shortly after its release, the lyric video was uploaded to Vevo on November 26. It contains various photos of Grande from her childhood during Christmas.

Composition

"Santa Tell Me" is a Christmas song with influences of pop and R&B. It is written in the key of G major. Grande's vocals range from the low note of B3 to the high note of A5. Lyrically, the song features the protagonist asking Santa Claus to tell her if her new lover "really cares", and whether he will leave her like men in her past have.

Critical reception
Robbie Daw of Idolator opined that "Santa Tell Me" was a "cute, harmless stocking stuffer that ticks all the necessary boxes, in that there's classic instrumentation, a hummable chorus and lyrics that reflect a mixture of the festive season with the possibility of heartbreak at the holidays", while Brian Mansfield of USA Today compared the song unfavorably to Mariah Carey's "All I Want for Christmas Is You", stating that it fell short in its attempt at becoming a "seasonal staple".

Billboard placed "Santa Tell Me" at number 13 on their "The 100 Best Christmas Songs of All Time" list. It is the highest-ranking song on the list among those released in the 21st century.

Commercial performance
"Santa Tell Me" has recurrently charted in several nations every year since its original release in 2014. In the United States, "Santa Tell Me" debuted at number 65 on the weekly US Billboard Hot 100 chart dated December 13, 2014, and reached number 42 in its original run. Six years later, "Santa Tell Me" re-entered the Hot 100 at a new high of number 39 on the chart issue dated December 19, 2020, earning Grande her 35th top 40 entry of her career. It has since peaked at number 12, becoming Grande's 25th top 20 hit on Billboard Hot 100. The song also peaked at number seven on the Billboard Adult Contemporary chart on the week ending December 27, 2014. "Santa Tell Me" also topped the Billboard Holiday 100 chart on the week ending January 10, 2015, becoming only the third song, and second by a female artist, to do so since the chart's inception in 2010. As of 2018, the song had sold over 597,000 copies in the United States. On the Billboard Global 200, which tracks the most streamed and digitally sold songs in over 200 territories, "Santa Tell Me" peaked at number five, becoming Grande's third top-ten hit on the chart. 
 
In Canada, "Santa Tell Me" debuted at number 73 on the Canadian Hot 100, eventually reaching a peak of number 27 in its first chart run. The track re-entered the Canadian Hot 100 chart, and has since attained a new peak of number eight in 2020, becoming Grande's 19th top ten hit in the country.

In the United Kingdom, "Santa Tell Me" debuted on the UK Singles Chart at number 79 for the week of December 6, 2014, originally peaking at number 68 three weeks later. In 2015, it failed to re-enter the charts; however, in 2016, the song reached number 90. In 2017, it was among many other holiday songs (such as "Driving Home for Christmas" and "Step into Christmas") reaching new chart peaks in the UK by re-entering the UK Singles Chart at number 60, and climbing to an even higher position of number 29 the following week. It eventually reached number 13 on the week of December 28, 2018, attaining the same position once again the following year (in December 2019). In December 2020, "Santa Tell Me" re-entered the UK Singles Chart for a fifth consecutive year, reaching a new peak of number 11. With over 113 million plays "Santa Tell Me" is also the eighth most played Christmas track in the United Kingdom. It is the highest-placed modern Christmas song present in the top forty and the most streamed Christmas track in the United Kingdom released since 2010.

Impact 
"Santa Tell Me" has been dubbed a modern Christmas standard for its popularity in music streaming services throughout the years during holiday season.

Due to the song's lasting impact, Grande has been named "Princess of Christmas".

The song was included in Billboard's revision of their Greatest of All Time Holiday 100 Songs at 21st position. Due to the song being internationally popular during the Christmas season, it has been covered multiple times by various artists, such as Pentatonix and Nayeon from Twice.

Music video
The official video was released on December 12, 2014. It was directed by Alfredo Flores and Jones Crow. The video features Grande with her friends dancing, laughing and giving gifts around her house along with a two-minute outtake section at the end. It surpassed 100 million views on November 26, 2016, making it Grande's fourteenth Vevo-certified music video after "Let Me Love You".

Live performances
Grande first performed "Santa Tell Me" on November 18, 2014, at the A Very Grammy Christmas concert in the Shrine Auditorium in Los Angeles. The concert aired on December 5, 2014, on CBS. She also performed "Santa Tell Me" as part of the iHeartRadio Jingle Ball Tour 2014. On December 8, 2014, Grande performed the song while taping the Disney Parks Frozen Christmas Celebration TV special which aired on Christmas Day. The song was added to the setlist of the second North American leg of Grande's Sweetener World Tour, along with "December", "True Love", "Wit It This Christmas" and "Winter Things".

Charts

Weekly charts

Year-end charts

All-time charts

Certifications

References

External links
 
 

Songs about Santa Claus
2014 songs
2014 singles
American Christmas songs
Ariana Grande songs
Music videos directed by Chris Marrs Piliero
Songs written by Ariana Grande
Songs written by Ilya Salmanzadeh
Songs written by Savan Kotecha
Song recordings produced by Ilya Salmanzadeh
Swedish Christmas songs
Republic Records singles